SHBT may refer to:
 Speech and Hearing Bioscience and Technology
 Single heterojunction bipolar transistor
 Surrey Historic Buildings Trust